Line T1 may refer to:

Line T1 (Oslo Metro), a rapid transit line in Oslo, Norway
North Shore & Western Line, a commuter rail line numbered T1 in Sydney, New South Wales, Australia
Yizhuang T1 line, a tram line in Beijing, China